Peribalus is a genus of shield bugs in the family Pentatomidae.

Species
Peribalus congenitus Putshkov, 1965 
Peribalus inclusus (Dohrn, 1860)
Peribalus manifestus (Kiritshenko, 1952
Peribalus strictus (Fabricius, 1803)

References

Carpocorini
Pentatomomorpha genera
Hemiptera of Europe